The Minnesota Democratic Party was a political party in Minnesota that existed from the formation of Minnesota Territory in 1849 until 1944, when the party merged with the Minnesota Farmer-Labor Party to form the modern Minnesota Democratic-Farmer-Labor Party.

In the first two years after Minnesota's admission into the Union in 1858, the Minnesota Democratic Party was briefly the dominant party in the state; however, the 1860 presidential election and the Civil War dealt a devastating blow to the party from which it never really recovered. Between 1860 and 1918, the Minnesota Democratic Party was a distant second party to the dominant Republican Party. During that period, Democrats held the office of Governor of Minnesota for a grand total of seven years, never controlled either chamber of the Minnesota Legislature, and Minnesota never cast a single electoral vote in favor of a Democratic presidential nominee.

Following the establishment of the Farmer-Labor Party in 1918, the Minnesota Democratic Party was relegated to third party status, as the Farmer-Laborites became the primary opposition to the Republicans. During the 1930s, a political alliance between Minnesota Governor Floyd B. Olson and President Franklin D. Roosevelt bred closer cooperation between the Farmer-Laborites and the Democrats. With a large backing from Farmer-Laborites, Roosevelt became the first Democrat ever to win Minnesota's electoral votes in 1932, and went on to win the state in each of his re-election bids. In the 1936 gubernatorial election the Democratic Party opted not to run its own candidate for Governor, endorsing Farmer-Labor candidate Elmer Austin Benson instead.

After the Farmer-Laborites' spectacular fall from power in the 1938 general election, there was increasing pressure from the national Democratic Party for a merger between the Minnesota Democratic Party and the Farmer-Labor Party. In spite of substantial minorities in both parties continuing to oppose merging, the majority in the Farmer-Labor Party led by former-Governor Benson and the slim majority of the Minnesota Democratic Party led by future-Vice President Hubert H. Humphrey ultimately concluded such a merger in 1944, creating the Minnesota Democratic-Farmer-Labor Party.

Gubernatorial nominees

See also
Democratic Party (United States)
Minnesota Democratic-Farmer-Labor Party
Politics of Minnesota
Political party strength in Minnesota

Notes

1849 establishments in Minnesota Territory
1944 disestablishments in Minnesota
Political parties established in 1849
Political parties disestablished in 1944
History of Minnesota
Political parties in Minnesota